The secretary of state for environment, food and rural affairs, also referred to as the environment secretary, is a secretary of state in the Government of the United Kingdom, with overall responsibility for the Department for Environment, Food and Rural Affairs (Defra). The incumbent is a member of the Cabinet of the United Kingdom.

The office holder works alongside the other Defra ministers. The corresponding shadow minister is the shadow secretary of state for environment, food and rural affairs.

Responsibilities
The secretary of state has two main responsibilities at the Department for Environment, Food and Rural Affairs, to:
bear overall responsibility for all departmental issues.
lobby for the United Kingdom in other international negotiations on sustainable development and climate change.

List of environment secretaries

See also
List of Secretaries of state for the environment; Secretaries of state for the environment, transport and the regions

References

Environment, Food and Rural Affairs
Agriculture in England
Ministerial offices in the United Kingdom
Rural society in the United Kingdom
2001 establishments in the United Kingdom

pl:Ministrowie środowiska Wielkiej Brytanii